GJT may refer to:

 Ganja Takkar railway station, in Pakistan
 Girjet, a defunct Spanish airline
 Grand Junction Regional Airport, in Colorado
 Grand Junction (Amtrak station), in Colorado